This is a list of video games based on the anime series Science Ninja Team Gatchaman.

Battle of the Planets

Battle of the Planets is a video game based on a television series of the same name. The game was published in 1986 by Mikro-Gen Ltd for various home computer systems, including the Amstrad CPC, Commodore 64 and ZX Spectrum.

Kagaku Ninjatai Gatchaman

Kagaku Ninjatai Gatchaman is a strategy video game produced by Family Soft.

Gatchaman: The Shooting

Gatchaman: The Shooting is an action game based on the Gatchaman television series.

Pachi-Slot Gatchaman

Pachi-Slot Gatchaman is a video game of the television series of the same name.  The game was only released in Japan.

Also appeared in
Tatsunoko Fight (PlayStation, released by Takara in 2000)
Tatsunoko vs. Capcom: Cross Generation of Heroes (Arcade and Wii, released by Capcom in 2008)
Tatsunoko vs. Capcom: Ultimate All-Stars (Wii, released by Capcom in 2010)

References

External links

Pachi-Slot Gatchaman official site 
Pachi-Slot Gatchaman at UK GameSpot
 

Gatchaman (video game series)
Video games
Amiga games
PlayStation (console) games
PlayStation 2 games
Gatchaman
Gatchaman
Gatchaman
Video games developed in the United Kingdom